Edgewater is a census-designated place (CDP) in Anne Arundel County, Maryland, United States. The population was 9,023 at the 2010 census.

Geography
Edgewater is a suburb located southwest of Annapolis on the south side of the tidal South River. It is bordered by Mayo to the east, Riva to the west, and Lothian to the south. To the north, across the South River, are the communities of Parole and Annapolis Neck.

Edgewater is often considered a suburb of Annapolis due to its proximity and development in the area. The area is steadily increasing with retail and residential development. Edgewater is part of the southern portion of Anne Arundel County. Londontown, Southdown, South River Colony, Glebe Heights, Gingerville and Edgewater Beach are some of the neighborhoods found in Edgewater.

Demographics

Transportation
Maryland Route 2 (Solomons Island Road) is the main north–south road through the community lined with businesses and residential developments, leading north across the South River Bridge to Annapolis and south to Prince Frederick and beyond. Maryland Route 214 (Central Avenue) intersects MD 2 and forms the southern boundary of the CDP leading east to the communities of Beverly Beach and Mayo. Maryland Route 253 (Mayo Road) curves through the center of the CDP in the Londontown neighborhood connecting Routes 2 and 214.

Lee Airport is a general aviation airport in Edgewater.

Education
Edgewater is served by Anne Arundel County Public Schools.

These schools serve the Edgewater area:
Central Elementary
Edgewater Elementary
Mayo Elementary
Central Middle
South River High School
Center of Applied Technology South
Central Special School

References

Census-designated places in Maryland
Census-designated places in Anne Arundel County, Maryland
Maryland populated places on the Chesapeake Bay
Suburbs of Annapolis, Maryland